The Artoles Formation is a geological formation in Teruel and La Rioja, Spain whose strata date back to the Early Cretaceous. Dinosaur remains are among the fossils that have been recovered from the formation.

Vertebrate paleofauna

Dinosaurs 
The indeterminate remains of Coelurosauria, Dromaeosauridae, Euornithopoda, Iguanodontia, Sauropoda, Spinosauridae (previously labeled Baryonichidae indet.), Theropoda, Titanosauriformes have been found in Provincia de la Rioja, Spain.

Correlation

See also 
 List of dinosaur-bearing rock formations

References

Bibliography 
  

Geologic formations of Spain
Lower Cretaceous Series of Europe
Cretaceous Spain
Aptian Stage
Barremian Stage
Conglomerate formations
Sandstone formations
Shallow marine deposits
Paleontology in Spain
Formations